Klisurski Monastery (transliterated: Klisurski manastir) of "St. Cyril and St. Methodius," also known as Klisura Monastery, is a monastery of the Bulgarian Orthodox Church located in northwestern Bulgaria. It is the fourth largest monastery in Bulgaria. The complex includes two churches, three residential buildings, a farmyard and a kitchen.

Location 
Klisurski Monastery has the status of a separate settlement in the Varshets Municipality of the Montana Province. It is situated at the foot of the northern slopes of Todorini Kukla peak in the western Balkan Mountains. Nearby is the village of Tsvetkova bara (between the towns of Berkovitsa and Varshets).

History 
Klisurski Monastery was founded in the 1240 during the Second Bulgarian Empire. It was repeatedly destroyed during the Ottoman rule. In 1862 it was burned down and the monks and pilgrims were killed by a Turkish pasha and his soldiers. The monastery was reconstructed in 1869 and the church was officially consecrated in 1891.

Gallery

References

External links 

  Official Website
  Short film about Bulgarian nuns from Vardarska Macedonia, settled in the Klisurski monastery, youtube.com

Christian monasteries in Bulgaria
Bulgarian Orthodox monasteries
Buildings and structures in Montana Province